Jesus Aldo de Nigris Guajardo (born 22 July 1983) is a Mexican former professional footballer who played as a striker, who is the current assistant manager of Liga MX club Monterrey.

Club career

He started his career at the youth divisions of Tigres UANL, the biggest rival of CF Monterrey. Tigres debuted him on Liga MX. Aldo played some irregular seasons with Tigres, Veracruz and Necaxa until he arrived to Monterrey. In the first game after his brother's death he dedicated his only goal to him in an Apertura 2009 playoff game against América on 21 November  2009 in the second minute of the second half. He then scored two goals against Toluca in the semi-final. He also scored in the final against Cruz Azul, giving Monterrey the lead, and eventually dedicating the winning championship to his late brother.

A year later, Aldo would win his second league title with Monterrey, this time against Santos Laguna. On 27 April 2011, Monterrey won the CONCACAF Champions League, where they defeated MLS club Real Salt Lake in the final. De Nigris was their top goal scorer, with four, tied with teammate Humberto Suazo

C.D. Guadalajara
On 1 July 2013 Aldo signed with C.D. Guadalajara for 5 million dollars until June 30, 2016. He made his debut with the club on 18 August 2013 in a home match against Puebla F.C.

Return to C.F. Monterrey 2015 
On 10 June 2015 Aldo returned to Rayados. Yet the exact amount of the transaction is not known. He retired on 2017.

International career
He was called up to the Mexico national football team for the friendly matches against Bolivia on 24 February 2010 and New Zealand on 3 March 2010. Mexico defeated Bolivia 5–0, in which de Nigris entered to the game as a substitute. He started in his first game for Mexico against New Zealand, in which he played the first forty-five minutes, until being taken off at half-time. Mexico would win 2–0. Aldo would be left out of Javier Aguirre's 23-man squad for the 2010 FIFA World Cup due to an ankle injury, in which he took 12 weeks to recover.

On 29 March 2011 he scored his first international goal in a friendly match against Venezuela.

2011 CONCACAF Gold Cup 
De Nigris was named in the 23-man squad to participate in the CONCACAF Gold Cup. On 5 June  he scored the second goal in the 5–0 over El Salvador after coming on as a substitute in the second-half. On 9 June de Nigris again scored after coming off the bench in a 5–0 win over Cuba. Three days later, he would score again coming on in the second half in the quarter-final match against Guatemala. After Mexico and Honduras held each other to a 0–0 draw in the semi-final match, de Nigris opened the score in the first half of extra-time, heading in a corner kick. Mexico would win the match 2–0, thus advancing to the final.

International goals
Scores and results list Mexico's goal tally first.

Honours
Tigres UANL
InterLiga: 2005, 2006.

Monterrey
Primera División de México: Apertura 2009, Apertura 2010
InterLiga: 2010
CONCACAF Champions League: 2010–11, 2011–12,  2012–13

Mexico
CONCACAF Gold Cup: 2011

Individual
CONCACAF Champions League Golden Ball: 2012–13
Copa MX Golden Boot: Clausura 2015

Personal life
Aldo is the youngest of three brothers. His oldest brother, Alfonso "Poncho" de Nigris, is an actor and television host. His other brother, the late Antonio "Tano" de Nigris, was also a footballer. On 15 November 2009, Antonio died from a heart attack at the age of 31 in Greece while playing for AE Larissa. He is also of Italian descent.

References

External links

1983 births
Living people
Mexico international footballers
C.F. Monterrey players
Club Necaxa footballers
C.D. Veracruz footballers
Tigres UANL footballers
C.D. Guadalajara footballers
Mexican people of Italian descent
2011 CONCACAF Gold Cup players
2013 FIFA Confederations Cup players
CONCACAF Gold Cup-winning players
Mexico youth international footballers
Footballers from Nuevo León
Mexico under-20 international footballers
Sportspeople from Monterrey
Association football forwards
C.F. Monterrey non-playing staff
Mexican footballers